Fan (Fän) is a rural locality (a village) in Kazansky Selsoviet, Alsheyevsky District, Bashkortostan, Russia. The population was 108 as of 2010. There are 2 streets.

Geography 
Fan is located 18 km northwest of Rayevsky (the district's administrative centre) by road. Kazanka is the nearest rural locality.

References 

Rural localities in Alsheyevsky District